Leo Valiani (Weiczen Leó; 9 February 1909 – 18 September 1999) was an Italian historian, politician and journalist.

Early life
Valiani was born in Fiume (now Rijeka), on the Adriatic Sea (then in Hungarian part of Austria-Hungary, now in Croatia) to a Hungarian Jewish family. His surname would be forcibly Italianized, from Weiczen to Valiani, by the regime in 1927. In later childhood, Valiani lived in Trieste, and later, Italy.

Career and activities
In 1930, Valiani was sentenced to five years in prison for anti-Fascist acts he had committed in the 1920s. Valiani left for exile in France once he was released, before leaving for Spain where he fought during the Civil War on the side of the Republicans. In 1939, after the defeat by Franco, he fled to France where he was detained as a Communist in Camp Vernet together with Arthur Koestler (who wrote about it in his book Scum of the Earth), before later fleeing to Mexico. Originally a communist, he started to question Stalin's policies and his treatment of Trotsky's followers during the Spanish Civil War. He broke with the party in 1939 after the Molotov-Ribbentrop Pact.

In 1943, the British Special Operations Executive (SOE) sent Valiani secretly behind enemy lines in Italy across the unstable front between the Allied and Axis forces to Rome. He moved northward to work with resistance leader, Ferruccio Parri and with Milan's anti-fascist Comitato di Liberazione Nazionale. Valiani represented resistance leaders at meetings in Switzerland with American intelligence officers of the Office of Strategic Services (OSS), including Allen W. Dulles.

He joined the social-democrat Action Party (Partito d'Azione) of Parri. As a leader of the resistance in the north, Valiani helped organise the final partisan uprising in April 1945, and put his signature to the document ordering the execution of the captured Fascist dictator Benito Mussolini.

He was elected to the Italian Constituent Assembly in 1946 for the Action Party. When that party faded away – the ideals of a capitalist system with a social democratic face trampled under the conflicting interests of the larger Communist and Christian Democrat parties – he took refuge in historical studies. He adhered to the Italian Radical Party in 1956-1962 and, in the 1980s, to the Italian Republican Party.

Valiani considered journalism as his true career. He wrote for the news weekly L'Espresso for 35 years and collaborated with Il Mondo and the Corriere della Sera. President Sandro Pertini named him senator for life in 1980.

Death

He died in Milan on 18 September 1999, aged 90, and was buried at the Cimitero Monumentale, in the main chapel of the cemetery.

References

External links
 Leo Valiani, un testimone di questo secolo

1909 births
1999 deaths
Writers from Rijeka
Italian male journalists
Italian life senators
Members of Giustizia e Libertà
Action Party (Italy) politicians
Italian anti-fascists
Italian Republican Party politicians
Burials at the Cimitero Monumentale di Milano
20th-century Italian politicians
20th-century Italian journalists
Politicians from Rijeka
20th-century Italian male writers